Ivankov is a surname that may refer to:

 Dimitar Ivankov (born 1975), Bulgarian footballer
 Ivan Ivankov (born 1975), Belarusian artistic gymnast
 Vyacheslav Ivankov (1940–2009), Soviet and Russian mafioso
 Viktor Ivankov (1924–2021), Soviet and Russian military officer

Fiction
Emperio Ivankov, the fictional character from One Piece

Bulgarian-language surnames
Russian-language surnames